Duke Li of Jin (reigned 580–573 BC) was a ruler of the State of Jin, a major power during the Spring and Autumn period of ancient China. His ancestral name was Ji, given name Zhoupu (州蒲), though Shiji records his given name as Shouman (壽曼), and Duke Li was his posthumous title. Duke Li succeeded his father, Duke Jing of Jin, who abdicated after falling ill in summer 581 BC.  Duke Jing died a month later.

Battle of Masui
In 580 BC, the first year of his reign, Duke Li made an alliance with Duke Huan of the State of Qin.  The alliance did not last, however, as Jin attacked Qin two years later and defeated Qin at Masui (麻隧).

Battle of Yanling

Duke Li fought and won one of the most significant battles of the Spring and Autumn period, the Battle of Yanling, against Jin's archrival, the State of Chu.  In 577 BC, the Jin vassal state Zheng attacked the Chu vassal state Xu (許).  The next year Chu attacked Zheng in revenge, and forced Zheng to switch its loyalty to Chu.  Zheng then attacked Song, another Jin vassal state.  In 575 BC, Duke Li raised an army to attack Zheng, while King Gong of Chu led the Chu army north to defend his new ally.

The two forces met at Yanling, and Jin defeated Chu by attacking its weaker flanks manned by the poorly trained Zheng and Dongyi soldiers.  During the battle King Gong was shot in the eye by an arrow.  Despite his wound, at the end of the day King Gong summoned the chief military commander Zifan to discuss the battle plan for the next day, but caught Zifan drunk.  King Gong decided to retreat and Zifan later committed suicide.

Struggle against the clans
Although Jin regained its status as the leader of the Spring and Autumn states by defeating Chu, it would soon be riven by internal strife that would eventually lead to its partition into the new states of Han, Zhao, and Wei.  During the reign of Duke Li the Xi (郤) clan, led by Xi Qi (郤錡), Xi Chou (郤犨), and Xi Zhi (郤至) – together called the three Xis – was one of the most powerful clans that dominated Jin politics.  In 573 BC Duke Li struck the Xi clan and killed the three Xis.  However, two other clans, the Luan (欒氏) led by Luan Shu (欒書), and the Zhonghang (中行氏) led by Zhonghang Yan (中行偃), staged a coup d'etat and imprisoned Duke Li.  The Luan and Zhonghang clans installed Zhou, a prince from a cadet branch of the ruling House of Ji, on the Jin throne.  Zhou would later be known as Duke Dao of Jin.  Duke Li was killed soon afterwards.

References

Year of birth unknown
Monarchs of Jin (Chinese state)
6th-century BC Chinese monarchs
573 BC deaths